The 2013 Challenger Banque Nationale de Granby was a professional tennis tournament played on outdoor hard courts. It was the 20th edition, for men, and 3rd edition, for women, of the tournament and part of the 2013 ATP Challenger Tour and the 2013 ITF Women's Circuit, offering totals of $50,000, for men, and $25,000, for women, in prize money. It took place in Granby, Quebec, Canada between July 15 and July 21, 2013.

Men's singles main-draw entrants

Seeds

1 Rankings are as of July 8, 2013

Other entrants
The following players received wildcards into the singles main draw:
 Philip Bester
 Hugo Di Feo
 Filip Peliwo
 Brayden Schnur

The following players received entry from the qualifying draw:
 Tyler Hochwalt
 Pavel Krainik
 Blake Mott
 Milan Pokrajac

Champions

Men's singles

 Frank Dancevic def.  Lukáš Lacko, 6–4, 6–7(4–7), 6–3

Women's singles

 Risa Ozaki def.  Samantha Murray, 0–6, 7–5, 6–2

Men's doubles

 Érik Chvojka /  Peter Polansky def.  Adam El Mihdawy /  Ante Pavić, 6–4, 6–3

Women's doubles

 Lena Litvak /  Carol Zhao def.  Julie Coin /  Emily Webley-Smith, 7–5, 6–4

External links
Official website

Challenger de Granby
Challenger Banque Nationale de Granby
Challenger Banque Nationale de Granby
Challenger Banque Nationale de Granby
Challenger Banque Nationale de Granby